Brett L. Tolman (born June 10, 1970) is a former United States Attorney for the District of Utah from July 2006 to December 2009.  Before becoming U.S. Attorney, Tolman worked as counsel in the Senate Judiciary Committee for committee chairs Orrin Hatch (R-UT) and then Arlen Specter (R-PA) during the 109th United States Congress. Tolman’s most noteworthy work in the Senate is his role in the passage of the 2005 Patriot Act reauthorization. He was instrumental in the revisions to the appointment process of interim U.S. Attorneys and is a major (if not well-known) figure in the dismissal of U.S. attorneys controversy.

Early career

Tolman received a Bachelor of Arts degree in English from Brigham Young University in 1994, and his law degree cum laude from the J. Reuben Clark Law School in 1998. Tolman clerked for U.S. District Chief Judge Dee Benson from 1998 to 2000. Tolman then served
four years as an assistant U.S. Attorney in the District of Utah under U.S. Attorney Paul Warner. In 2003, he began work on the staff of U.S. Sen. Orrin Hatch, (R-UT),
chairman of the Senate Judiciary Committee. Later, Tolman staffed for Sen. Arlen Specter (R-PA) after Specter became judiciary chairman. While working for Senators Hatch and Specter, Tolman was Counsel for Crime and Terrorism, which included work on drafting and negotiating passage of the USA PATRIOT Act reauthorization.

Dismissal of U.S. attorneys controversy

During Senate hearings on February 6, 2007, Senator Specter claimed that Tolman, on behalf of the United States Department of Justice, added a clause to the bill that eliminated the
term limits for interim appointments of U.S. Attorneys by the Attorney General.  The change in effect allowed the President to bypass the Senatorial approval process for those interim U.S. Attorneys appointed by the Attorney General. This change in the law is at the center of the dismissal of U.S. Attorneys controversy.

On March 20, 2007, the Senate voted 94–2 to re-instate the 120-day term limit on interim attorneys appointed by the Attorney General. On March 26, the U.S. House overturned it as well, by a vote of 329–78. The bill was sent to President Bush for his signature on June 4, 2007.

Appointment as U.S. Attorney

On January 25, 2006, U.S. Attorney for the District of Utah, Paul Warner, announced he would step down to become the newly created fourth U.S. Magistrate Judge for the District of Utah. A struggle over who would succeed him in office ensued, the two candidates being Tolman and Kyle Sampson, then Attorney General Alberto Gonzales’s chief of staff at the Department of Justice. Both Tolman and Sampson are Utah natives who had graduated from Brigham Young University.  While Gonzales and the White House favored Sampson, Tolman received support from Senator Orrin Hatch (R-UT), Senate Judiciary Committee chairman Arlen Specter (R-PA), Senate Majority Leader Bill Frist      
(R-TN), Senate Majority Whip Mitch McConnell (R-KY), and Senate Judiciary Committee member Mike DeWine (R-OH).
Senator Hatch made a personal appeal to Attorney General Gonzales to drop his nomination of Kyle Sampson.  On June 9, 2006, President Bush nominated Tolman to the Utah post, and on July 21, 2006 the senate confirmed Tolman by voice vote.

In December 2009, Tolman resigned and joined the Salt Lake City law firm Ray Quinney & Nebeker.  Until a replacement could be named by President Obama and confirmed by the Senate, Carlie Christensen, a career attorney with the office, has been named as Acting U.S. Attorney. In 2019, Tolman resigned from Ray Quinney Nebeker to start his own firm, The Tolman Group. Brett Tolman founded The Tolman Group to focus on public policy and government reform. He has been featured on Fox News discussing current events.

Pardon lobbying in the Trump Administration 

On January 17, 2021, the New York Times published an article reporting that Tolman has "collect[ed] tens of thousands of dollars, and possibly more, in recent weeks to lobby the White House for clemency for the son of a former Arkansas senator; the founder of the notorious online drug marketplace Silk Road; and a Manhattan socialite who pleaded guilty in a fraud scheme".

References

External links
U.S. Attorney's Office - District of Utah

1970 births
American Latter Day Saints
J. Reuben Clark Law School alumni
Dismissal of U.S. attorneys controversy
Living people
United States Attorneys for the District of Utah